Notius is a genus of stink bugs, first described by Willam Sweetman Dallas in 1851.

Species 
This genus includes the following species:

 Notius consputus Stål, 1865
 Notius depressus Dallas, 1851
 Notius melancholicus Bergroth, 1912
 Notius patulus (Walker, 1867)
 Notius posticus (Walker, 1867)

References

External links 
 

Carpocorini
Pentatomidae genera